Marie Lindebø Knutsen (born 31 August 1982) is a Norwegian former football midfielder who played for Røa of Norway's Toppserien league and represented the Norwegian national team.

Club career
Aside from Røa IL, Knutsen has also played for Kattem IL, Flatås, Byåsen and Trondheims-Ørn. She was named as part of the NISO Women's Team of the Year in 2007.

After missing 2010 and 2011 through giving birth and moving away to America, Knutsen returned to Røa in 2012. She retired from football ahead of the club's 2013 Toppserien campaign.

National team
Knutsen made her debut for the senior national team on 19 February 2005 in a match against France. Her first goal came on 20 January 2006 in a match against China.

She was part of the squad for the 2007 Women's World Cup, playing in five matches, as well as the 2008 Summer Olympics held in Beijing, China, where she appeared in three matches. Knutsen also played in the 2005 European Championships, winning the silver medal after Norway lost 3–1 to Germany in the final at Ewood Park, Blackburn.

On 21 October 2008 Marie Knutsen and four other Røa players—Lene Mykjåland, Guro Knutsen, Marit Fiane Christensen and Siri Nordby—made headlines when they announced in a press release that they would not be returning to the national team due to issues the five had with the national team leadership. While the press statement never mentioned coach Bjarne Berntsen's name, it was assumed that he was instrumental in their decision to retire from the team. The retirement, construed in many newspapers as a boycott, created widespread media attention.

Berntsen's successor Eli Landsem reintegrated the Røa players and Knutsen won her 55th and final cap in a 1–0 win over Slovakia in October 2009.

International goals

Personal
Knutsen studied psychology and was married in the summer of 2008.  In January 2010 she announced she was expecting her first child and would not play football during 2010.  She and her husband Patrick Johansen then moved to New York City, USA where they lived with their son Jasper.  Knutsen played amateur football for Rovers in the New York Metropolitan Women's Soccer League. Her younger sister, Guro Knutsen continued to play for Røa IL. Both sisters are members of the Christian sports organization Kristen Idrettskontakt (KRIK).

Honors

Club
Røa
League champion 2007, 2008, 2009
Cup champion 2006, 2008, 2009
 Trondheims-Ørn
 League champion 2003

References

External links
 
 
 
 
 
 

1982 births
Living people
Norwegian women's footballers
Norwegian Christians
Norway women's international footballers
Footballers at the 2008 Summer Olympics
Olympic footballers of Norway
Footballers from Trondheim
Røa IL players
Toppserien players
SK Trondheims-Ørn players
Expatriate women's soccer players in the United States
Norwegian expatriate women's footballers
2007 FIFA Women's World Cup players
Norwegian expatriate sportspeople in the United States
Women's association football midfielders